NHH may refer to:
 North Hill House School, an independent specialist school in Frome, Somerset, United Kingdom
 Norwegian School of Economics
 NHH-Symposium, a business conference in Bergen, Norway
 Non-ketotic hyperglycemic hemichorea, a brain disorder
 Non half-hourly, a class of commercial electricity metering in the UK
 Niehai Hua, a Chinese novel
 North Hampshire Hospital, a hospital located in Basingstoke, Hampshire, UK.